WWCI-CD (channel 10) is a low-power, Class A television station in Vero Beach, Florida, United States. Owned by Innovate Corp., the station broadcasts from a transmitter on 83rd Street in Fellsmere, Florida.

History
The station's construction permit was issued on November 20, 1992, under the call sign of W10CI. The station then began broadcasting in March 1996, primarily relying on National Empowerment Television as its program source. Renamed WWCI-LP later that year, the station was added to local cable systems six months after starting and began producing local news and talk programming for Indian River County and St. Lucie County. This was supplemented with news from Bloomberg Television, America's Voice (the former NET), and All News Channel.

V One Broadcasting sold WWCI-CD to HC2 in 2018.

Subchannels

References

Television channels and stations established in 1996
Vero Beach, Florida
WCI-CD
Low-power television stations in the United States
1996 establishments in Florida
Innovate Corp.